Gary Grant (born 1934) is an American former politician in the state of Washington. He served the 47th district from 1963 to 1973.

References

Living people
1934 births
King County Councillors
Politicians from Chippewa Falls, Wisconsin
Democratic Party members of the Washington House of Representatives